Amerila lupia is a moth of the subfamily Arctiinae. It was described by Herbert Druce in 1887. It is found in Kenya, Mozambique, South Africa, Tanzania, Zambia and Zimbabwe.

References

 , 1887: Description of some new species of Lepidoptera Heterocera, mostly from Tropical Africa. Proceedings of the scientific meetings of the Zoological Society of London 1887: 668-686, pl. LV.
 , 1997: A revision of the Afrotropical taxa of the genus Amerila Walker (Lepidoptera, Arctiidae). Systematic Entomology 22 (1): 1-44.
 , 1911: Neue Gattungen und Arten afrikanischer Heterocera (Lep.). Deutsche Entomologische Zeitschrift 1911: 584-591.
 , 1892: Exotische Lepidopteren VI. (Aus dem afrikanischen Faunengebiet.). Entomologische Zeitung herausgegeben von dem entomologischen Vereine zu Stettin 53 (4-6): 79-125.

Moths described in 1887
Amerilini
Lepidoptera of Mozambique
Lepidoptera of Tanzania
Lepidoptera of Zambia
Lepidoptera of Zimbabwe
Moths of Sub-Saharan Africa
Lepidoptera of South Africa
Lepidoptera of Kenya